Pencak silat was contested at the 2009 Asian Indoor Games in Hải Dương, Vietnam from 2 November to 7 November. The competition took place at Hải Dương Gymnasium. There were four seni events in original program but men's regu event was cancelled due to lack of entries.

Medalists

Seni

Men's tanding

Women's tanding

Medal table

Results

Seni

Men's tunggal
5 November

Women's tunggal
5 November

Women's regu
5 November

Men's tanding

55 kg

60 kg

65 kg

70 kg

75 kg

80 kg

85 kg

Women's tanding

50 kg

55 kg

60 kg

65 kg

70 kg

References
 Official website

2009 Asian Indoor Games events